Peronospora valerianellae is a plant pathogen. It causes downy mildew on leaves of lamb's lettuce Valerianella locusta, which is widely grown as a salad plant in several European countries (for example France and Germany). It is transmitted by seed-borne oospores, and is controlled by fungicide sprays of the foliage.

References

External links

Water mould plant pathogens and diseases
Leaf vegetable diseases
Peronosporales
Species described in 1888
Taxa named by Karl Wilhelm Gottlieb Leopold Fuckel